Kota Shrine or Kota-jinja can mean:

 Kota Shrine (Miyazaki), a Japanese Shinto shrine in Miyazaki Prefecture
 Kota Shrine (Niigata), a Japanese Shinto shrine in Niigata Prefecture